Bret Peter Tarrant McKenzie  (born 29 June 1976) is a New Zealand musician, comedian, music supervisor, and actor. He is best known as one half of musical comedy duo Flight of the Conchords along with Jemaine Clement. In the 2000s, the duo's comedy and music became the basis of a BBC radio series and then an oft-lauded American television series, which aired for two seasons on HBO. Active since 1998, the duo released their most recent comedy special, Live in London, in 2018.

Primarily a musician, McKenzie has worked as a songwriter and music supervisor for film and television since the 2010s. He served as music supervisor for two Muppet films, The Muppets (2011) and Muppets Most Wanted (2014), the former of which won him an Academy Award for Best Original Song for the song "Man or Muppet". In the 2000s, McKenzie was part of reggae fusion band The Black Seeds and Wellington International Ukulele Orchestra, and, in the 2010s, he began performing solo material. His debut album Songs Without Jokes was released in August 2022.

As an actor, he portrayed elves in Peter Jackson's The Lord of the Rings and The Hobbit film trilogies: in the first he remained unnamed with fans naming him Figwit, a character originally cast as an extra who gained attention thanks to the trilogy's fan community. He later appears in The Hobbit as Lindir, a minor character who originally appears in the book of The Fellowship of the Ring.

Early life 
McKenzie was born in Wellington to Peter McKenzie, a part-time actor, and Deirdre Tarrant, a contemporary dance teacher. He was raised in Kelburn with his brothers Justin and Jonny. McKenzie attended Clifton Terrace Model School between 1982 and 1987 ("model" refers to a standard school for training teachers as opposed to modelling). His classmates at the school included Antonia Prebble and Age Pryor.

McKenzie then went on to Wellington College where he was a prefect and won the Wellington regional heats of the Smokefree Rockquest with his jazz and funk band, The Blue Samanthas.

Career

Flight of the Conchords 

While studying at Victoria University of Wellington, McKenzie met Jemaine Clement, a fellow student who was also studying film and theatre. They didn't complete their degrees but ended up living together and first were members of So You're a Man, and then later forming Flight of the Conchords.

As Flight of the Conchords they have toured internationally and released four CDs: Folk the World Tour in 2002,The Distant Future (which won the Grammy Award for Best Comedy Album) in 2007, the Grammy nominated Flight of the Conchords in 2008, and I Told You I Was Freaky in 2009. The Conchords produced a six-part improvisational comedy radio program for the BBC and have appeared on Late Night with Conan O'Brien, the Late Show with David Letterman and The Late Late Show with Craig Ferguson.

After a successful appearance in 2005 on HBOs One Night Stand, the Conchords were offered their own 12-part HBO series Flight of the Conchords. Its first season ran from June to September 2007, and its second season premiered on HBO 18 January 2009. Along with Clement, McKenzie was featured as 2007 Salon "Sexiest Man Living" and 2008's "100 Sexiest People" in a special edition of the Australian magazine Who. More recently, the duo toured in 2012, 2016, and 2018.

Acting 
McKenzie has acted periodically since making his professional acting debut in 2000, a small role in the UK series Dark Knight which was filmed in Wellington. Outside the Flight of the Conchords television adaption, he is most notable for his appearances in the first and third films in Peter Jackson's The Lord of the Rings trilogy. His silent role in the first film as Figwit achieved some minor internet fame, which led to Jackson giving him a line in the third film. His father Peter McKenzie played the role of Elendil in Lord of the Rings. In April 2011, McKenzie was cast as the elf Lindir for The Hobbit.

McKenzie, together with Australian comedian Hamish Blake, starred in a New Zealand feature film, Two Little Boys, finished in late 2011 and released in New Zealand in March 2012. He had a supporting role in the 2013 film Austenland.

Guest starring roles include him and fellow Conchord Clement as a pair of camp counselors in "Elementary School Musical", the season premiere of the 22nd season of The Simpsons, which aired on 26 September 2010, and other comedies.

Music and songwriting for screen 
McKenzie has contributed to a number of projects outside of Flight of the Conchords. In the late 1990s, McKenzie joined the reggae fusion group The Black Seeds; he put out four albums with band before leaving around 2007. The Black Seeds had some minor radio hits during his tenure, and continue to be regionally successful. In the mid-2000s, he released music under the name The Video Kid, including his album Prototype. In 2005, he helped form the Wellington International Ukulele Orchestra which was active into the 2010s.

In the late 2010s, he began writing and recording solo material again, and later toured New Zealand in 2018 with a collective that included musicians Age Pryor and Nigel Collins.

During the summer of 2010, McKenzie flew to Los Angeles to serve as the music supervisor for The Muppets. He went on to write four of the five original songs from the film's soundtrack including "Man or Muppet" and "Life's a Happy Song" both of which were nominated for Broadcast Film Critics Association Awards and Satellite Awards for Best Original Song. At the 84th Academy Awards in 2012 his song, "Man or Muppet", won the Academy Award for Best Original Song.

McKenzie then wrote the original songs for the 2014 movie Muppets Most Wanted, as well as songs for other children's films like The Pirates! Band of Misfits and Dora and the Lost City of Gold. Other credits include the 2016 Sainsbury's Christmas advert featuring James Corden on vocals. He has written songs for The Simpsons on numerous occasions.

McKenzie released his debut solo album, Songs Without Jokes, on Sub Pop in August 2022. The release will be followed with an extensive tour in New Zealand, Great Britain, Ireland, and North America. The album is inspired by the songwriting of Steely Dan, Randy Newman, and Harry Nilsson.

Personal life 
He is married to New Zealand publicist Hannah Clarke and currently maintains residences in Los Angeles, New York City, and Wellington. They have three children and mainly live in Wellington.

In the 2012 Queen's Birthday and Diamond Jubilee Honours, McKenzie was appointed an Officer of the New Zealand Order of Merit, for services to music and film.

Awards and nominations

Filmography

Discography

Solo 

 Prototype (2004) (as The Video Kid)
 Songs Without Jokes (2022) – No. 40 New Zealand

Collaborative 
The Black Seeds

 Keep On Pushing (2001)
 On the Sun (2004)
 Into The Dojo (2006)
 Sometimes Enough EP (2007)

Flight of the Conchords

 Folk the World Tour (2002)
 The Distant Future  (2007)
 Flight of the Conchords (2008)
 I Told You I Was Freaky (2009)
 Live in London (2019)

Wellington International Ukulele Orchestra

 The Heartache EP (2007)
 A Little Bit Wonderful EP (2008)
 The Dreaming EP (2009)
 I Love You... EP (2010)

Notes

References

External links

 
 Flight of the Conchords Official Site
 What The Folk! Flight of the Conchords fan site
 BBC Radio 2
 Flight of the Conchords Official MySpace

1976 births
Best Original Song Academy Award-winning songwriters
Grammy Award winners
Flight of the Conchords members
People educated at Wellington College (New Zealand)
Living people
New Zealand male comedians
Musicians from Wellington
New Zealand male television actors
Male actors from Wellington City
Officers of the New Zealand Order of Merit
21st-century New Zealand male actors
21st-century New Zealand male singers
New Zealand male film actors